AnimeNEXT (AN) is an annual three-day anime convention held at the New Jersey Convention and Exposition Center in Edison, New Jersey. The convention was previously held at the Meadowlands Exposition Center in Secaucus, New Jersey, the Garden State Exhibit Center in Somerset, New Jersey, and the Atlantic City Convention Center in Atlantic City, New Jersey.

Programming
The convention typically offers anime music video (AMV) screenings, cosplay chess, a dance, dealer's room, karaoke, panels, masquerade, video gaming, and video rooms.

History
The first convention in 2002 was put on with limited staffing and was planned in eight months. In 2008 parts of the convention were held in the parking garage below the Meadowlands Exposition Center. The convention then moved to the Garden State Exhibit Center, although it experienced crowding issues in 2012 with outdoor space used for lines. AnimeNEXT moved to the Atlantic City Convention Center in Atlantic City, New Jersey for 2016, with the deal lasting until 2020. The convention moved due to outgrowing the Garden State Exhibit Center. In 2016, the United States finals of the World Cosplay Summit were held at AnimeNEXT. Major communication and scheduling issues with panels occurred before and during the 2017 convention. Accusations of past staff member harassment were published in 2019, with former con chair Eric Torgersen being suspended in April.

AnimeNEXT 2020 was cancelled due to the COVID-19 pandemic. The convention was changed to an online only event for 2021, due to the Atlantic City Convention Center being used as a large scale COVID-19 vaccination center. AnimeNEXT 2022 was cancelled due to problems with the Atlantic City Convention Center. Issues included significant price increases for the venue, lack of COVID-19 polices, and no communication about another event in the area during the same weekend, the Orange Loop Rock Festival.

Event history

Manga library
AnimeNEXT has taken their Manga library to other conventions, including Otakon and New York Comic Con.

See also

 MangaNEXT

References

Other Related News Articles
AnimeNEXT to debut at A.C. Convention Center  Press of Atlantic City, Retrieved 2016-06-26

External links

 AnimeNEXT Website

Anime conventions in the United States
Recurring events established in 2002
2002 establishments in New Jersey
Annual events in New Jersey
New Jersey culture
Festivals in New Jersey
Conventions in New Jersey